Lobesia is a genus of moths belonging to the subfamily Olethreutinae of the family Tortricidae.

Species

Lobesia abscisana (Doubleday, 1859)
Lobesia acroleuca Diakonoff, 1973
Lobesia aeolopa Meyrick, 1907
Lobesia albotegula Diakonoff, 1954
Lobesia ambigua Diakonoff, 1954
Lobesia archaetypa Diakonoff, 1992
Lobesia arenacea (Meyrick, 1917)
Lobesia arescophanes (Turner, 1945)
Lobesia artemisiana (Zeller, 1847)
Lobesia atrata Diakonoff, 1973
Lobesia atsushii Bae, 1993
Lobesia attributana (Kennel, 1901)
Lobesia bicinctana (Duponchel, in Godart, 1842)
Lobesia bisyringnata Bae, 1993
Lobesia botrana ([Denis & Schiffermüller], 1775)
Lobesia candida Diakonoff, 1973
Lobesia carduana (Busck, 1907)
Lobesia ceratana (Rebel, 1907)
Lobesia cinerariae (Nolcken, 1882)
Lobesia clarisecta Meyrick, 1932
Lobesia clavosa Diakonoff, 1973
Lobesia coccophaga Falkovitsh, 1970
Lobesia confinitana (Staudinger, 1871)
Lobesia crimea Falkovitsh, 1970
Lobesia crithopa Diakonoff, 1957
Lobesia cunninghamiacola (Liu & Bai, 1977)
Lobesia deltophora (Meyrick, 1921)
Lobesia drasteria Razowski, 2013
Lobesia duplicata Falkovitsh, 1970
Lobesia elasmopyga Diakonoff, 1973
Lobesia embrithes Diakonoff, 1961
Lobesia extrusana (Walker, 1863)
Lobesia fetialis (Meyrick, 1920)
Lobesia fictana (Kennel, 1901)
Lobesia fuligana (Haworth, [1811])
Lobesia genialis Meyrick, 1912
Lobesia glebifera (Meyrick, 1912)
Lobesia globosterigma Liu & Bae, 1994
Lobesia harmonia (Meyrick, 1908)
Lobesia hecista Razowski, 2013
Lobesia hendrickxi (Ghesquire, 1940)
Lobesia herculeana (Kennel, 1900)
Lobesia incystata Liu & Yang, 1987
Lobesia indusiana (Zeller, 1847)
Lobesia isochroa (Meyrick, 1891)
Lobesia kurokoi Bae, 1995
Lobesia leucospilana (Mabille, 1900)
Lobesia limoniana (Millire, 1860)
Lobesia lithogonia Diakonoff, 1954
Lobesia littoralis (Humphreys & Westwood, 1845)
Lobesia longisterigma Liu & Bae, 1994
Lobesia macroptera Liu & Bae, 1994
Lobesia matici Stanoiu & Nemes, 1974
Lobesia mechanodes (Meyrick, 1936)
Lobesia melanops Diakonoff, 1956
Lobesia meliscia (Meyrick, 1910)
Lobesia metachlora (Meyrick, 1913)
Lobesia mieae Kawabe, 1980
Lobesia minuta Diakonoff, 1956
Lobesia montana Diakonoff, 1954
Lobesia moriutii Bae, 1995
Lobesia neptunia (Walsingham, 1907)
Lobesia orphica (Meyrick, 1920)
Lobesia orthomorpha (Meyrick, 1928)
Lobesia oxymochla (Meyrick, 1917)
Lobesia oxypercna (Meyrick, 1930)
Lobesia paradisea Diakonoff, 1953
Lobesia paraphragma (Meyrick, 1922)
Lobesia parvulana (Walker, 1863)
Lobesia pattayae Bae, 1995
Lobesia peltophora (Meyrick, 1911)
Lobesia peplotoma Meyrick, 1928
Lobesia physophora (Lower, 1901)
Lobesia porrectana (Zeller, 1847)
Lobesia postica Bae, 1993
Lobesia primaria (Meyrick, 1909)
Lobesia pyriformis Bae & Park, 1992
Lobesia quadratica (Meyrick, 1912)
Lobesia quaggana (Mann, 1855)
Lobesia rapta Diakonoff, 1957
Lobesia relicta Diakonoff, 1954
Lobesia reliquana (Hübner, [1825])
Lobesia reprobata Clarke, 1976
Lobesia rhipidoma (Meyrick, 1925)
Lobesia rhombophora Diakonoff, 1954
Lobesia scorpiodes (Meyrick, 1908)
Lobesia semosa Diakonoff, 1992
Lobesia serangodes (Meyrick, 1920)
Lobesia siamensis Bae, 1995
Lobesia stenaspis (Meyrick, 1921)
Lobesia stericta (Meyrick, 1911)
Lobesia subherculeana (Filipjev, 1924)
Lobesia sutteri Diakonoff, 1956
Lobesia symploca (Turner, 1926)
Lobesia takahiroi Bae, 1996
Lobesia thlastopa Meyrick in Caradja & Meyrick, 1937
Lobesia transtrifera (Meyrick, 1920)
Lobesia tritoma Diakonoff, 1953
Lobesia ultima Diakonoff, 1954
Lobesia vanillana (de Joannis, 1900)
Lobesia vectis Diakonoff, 1983
Lobesia virulenta Bae & Komai, 1991
Lobesia vittigera (Meyrick, 1932)
Lobesia xenosema Diakonoff, 1983
Lobesia xylistis (Lower, 1901)
Lobesia yasudai Bae & Komai, 1991

See also
 List of Tortricidae genera

References

External links
 Tortricidae.com

Olethreutini
Tortricidae genera
Taxa named by Achille Guenée